Pierre-Yves Ragot (born 14 May 1986) is a French handball.

In 2020, he spent two weeks in jail as he was accused to be a drug dealer. He then confessed that he has been abused as a child.

Achievements
Liga Națională:
Gold Medalist: 2016  
Supercupa României:
Winner: 2016

References

External links

French male handball players
Sportspeople from Nancy, France
Living people
1986 births
Expatriate handball players
French expatriate sportspeople in Spain
French expatriate sportspeople in Romania
CS Dinamo București (men's handball) players